Little Orton is a hamlet in the English county of Leicestershire.

Little Orton is part  of the civil parish of Twycross (where the population is included) ; it is located southwest of the main village being divided from it by the A444 road and Twycross Zoo.

References 

Hamlets in Leicestershire
Twycross